Raymond Rollins Sermon (March 1, 1893 – October 12, 1965) was an American college football and basketball player and coach. He served as the head football coach at Central Methodist University in Fayette, Missouri in 1917 and at Missouri S&T in Rolla, Missouri from 1918 to 1919.

Sermon served as the head men's basketball coach at North Carolina State University in Raleigh, North Carolina form 1930 to 1940.

Sermon died on October 12, 1965.

References

1893 births
1965 deaths
Basketball coaches from Missouri
Central Methodist Eagles football coaches
Central Missouri Mules football players
Missouri S&T Miners football coaches
NC State Wolfpack athletic directors
NC State Wolfpack men's basketball coaches
Players of American football from Missouri
Sportspeople from Independence, Missouri
Springfield Pride football players